The Central African Democratic Union (UDC) was a political party in the Central African Republic.

History
The UDC was established by David Dacko in March 1980 at a congress. Dacko claimed that the UDC was the continuation of Movement for the Social Evolution of Black Africa (MESAN). The party was banned on 2 September 1981, following the 1981 Central African Republic coup d'état.

Electoral history

Presidential elections

References 

1980 establishments in the Central African Republic
1981 disestablishments in the Central African Republic
African and Black nationalist parties in Africa
Defunct political parties in the Central African Republic
Parties of one-party systems
Political parties disestablished in 1981
Political parties established in 1980
Republican parties